Boe Lionel Warawara (born 26 January 1995) is a Vanuatan bantamweight boxer.

Boxing career 
In 2014 and 2015 Warawara won the Vanuatu National Games in the 56 kg category.

He finished in third place at the 2015 Pacific Games after he lost to Henry Umings in the semifinal.

Warawara won the OCBC Oceania Confederation Boxing Championships against Jayden Hansen in the 56 kg class.

In 2016 he represented Vanuatu in the men's bantamweight at the 2016 Summer Olympics in Rio de Janeiro. He lost by unanimous decision in his first bout to Russia's Vladimir Nikitin.

In March 2017 Lionel Warawara began training at the https://www.warriorboxinggym.com in Brisbane, Australia under the tutelage of Aiba Star 2 coach Johnny Black. 
Qualification for the AIBA world championships 2017 were achieved, 
Later that year in December 2017 Lionel Warawara won a Gold medal at the pacific mini-game held in Vanuatu.

In April 2018 Lionel Warawara and his Head coach Johnny Black were selected to represent Vanuatu for the 2018 Commonwealth Games held on the Gold Coast.

References

External links
 

1995 births
Living people
Vanuatuan male boxers
Olympic boxers of Vanuatu
Boxers at the 2016 Summer Olympics
Commonwealth Games competitors for Vanuatu
Boxers at the 2018 Commonwealth Games
Bantamweight boxers